Santiria apiculata is a species of flowering plant in the family Burseraceae. It is found in Indonesia, Malaysia, the Philippines, and Singapore.

References

apiculata
Least concern plants
Taxonomy articles created by Polbot
Taxa named by Alfred William Bennett